Coming Up For Air is the 13th studio album by Dutch progressive rock band Kayak. It was released in 2008. The song "Undecided" was a single in The Netherlands, featuring the non-albumtrack "Beat The Clock".

Track listing 
 "Alienation" (Scherpenzeel/Linders)- 3:55
 "Man In The Cocoon" (Koopman/Oudshoorn)- 2:53
 "Time Stand Still" (Scherpenzeel/Linders)- 3:21
 "Freezing" (Scherpenzeel/Linders)- 3:50
 "Medea" (Scherpenzeel/Linders)- 3:47
 "Daughter Of The Moon" (Koopman)- 3:41
 "Undecided" (Scherpenzeel/Linders)- 4:09
 "Sad State Of Affairs" (Koopman)- 4:23
 "About You Without You" (Koopman)- 3:16
 "The Mask And The Mirror" (Scherpenzeel/Linders)- 4:45
 "Selfmade Castle" (Koopman/Oudshoorn)- 3:33
 "What I'm About To Say" (Scherpenzeel/Linders)- 4:24
 "Wonderful Day" (Scherpenzeel/Linders)- 3:44
 "Broken White" (Scherpenzeel/Linders)- 4:25
 "Coming Up For Air" (Scherpenzeel/Linders)- 6:12

Lineup
 Ton Scherpenzeel - keyboards, vocals
 Pim Koopman - drums, keyboards, vocals, guitars
 Edward Reekers - lead and backing vocals
 Cindy Oudshoorn - lead and backing vocals
 Jan van Olffen - bass, vocals
 Rob Vunderink - guitars, lead and backing vocals
 Joost Vergoossen - guitars

Guest musicians
 Judith Groen - cello on "Freezing"

References

External links
Official site

2008 albums
Kayak (band) albums